The ramparts of Aigues-Mortes are the 13th century fortifications of the town Aigues-Mortes, in Gard, France. It is a listed historical monument since 1903.

References

External links 

 Official website

Castles in Gard
Buildings and structures in Gard